Eucalyptus moluccana, commonly known as the grey box, gum-topped box or terriyergro, is a medium-sized to tall tree with rough bark on part or all of the trunk, smooth bark above, lance-shaped adult leaves, flower buds usually in groups of seven, white flowers and cup-shaped to barrel-shaped fruit. It is found in near-coastal areas of Queensland and New South Wales.

Description
It has persistent rough, fibrous or flaky bark on part or all of the trunk, smooth whitish or light grey bark above, sometimes with a shiny surface. Flowering has been recorded in most months and the flowers are white.

Taxonomy and naming
Eucalyptus moluccana was first formally described in 1832 by William Roxburgh in his Flora Indica; or descriptions of Indian Plants. The specific epithet refers to the Moluccas, islands of Southeast Asia but is a misnomer. The Dharawal people know this species as terriyergro.

Distribution and habitat
Grey box is widespread on the coastal plains and ranges northwards from Jervis Bay in New South Wales to the area between Rockhampton and Mackay in Queensland.  Further north there is a substantial gap, with occurrences in the ranges from west of Paluma to the southern part of the Atherton Tableland and two small disjunct patches east of Clermont near Eungella Dam.

References

moluccana
Myrtales of Australia
Trees of Australia
Flora of New South Wales
Flora of Queensland
Taxa named by William Roxburgh